Quinn Gleason and Catherine Harrison were the defending champions but chose not to participate.

Anna Rogers and Christina Rosca won the title, defeating Madison Brengle and Maria Mateas in the final, 6–4, 6–4.

Seeds

Draw

Draw

References

External Links
Main Draw

Mercer Tennis Classic - Doubles